Hokkaido Tōshō-gū (北海道東照宮) is a Shinto shrine in Hakodate, Hokkaido Prefecture, Japan. It enshrines the first Shōgun of the Tokugawa Shogunate, Tokugawa Ieyasu. It was previously known as Hakodate Tōshō-gū (函館東照宮).

See also 
Tōshō-gū
List of Tōshō-gū

External links 
Hakodate tourism website

1864 establishments in Japan
Shinto shrines in Hokkaido
Tōshō-gū